Gent-Sint-Pieters railway station, officially Gent-Sint-Pieters, is the main railway station in Ghent, East Flanders, Belgium, and the fourth-busiest in Belgium and busiest in Flanders, with 17.65 million passengers a year. The station is operated by the National Railway Company of Belgium (NMBS/SNCB).

History

The origins of the railway station is a small station on the Ghent–Ostend line in 1881. At that time, the main railway station of Ghent was the South railway station, built in 1837. At the occasion of the 1913 International Exposition in Ghent, a new Sint-Pieters railway station was built. It was designed by the architect Louis Cloquet and finished in 1912 just before the World's Fair.

The station was built in an eclectic style with a long corridor dividing the building in its length which provides access to diverse facilities. A tunnel (designed by ir. P. Grondy) starting from the entrance hall provides access to the twelve platforms. This gives the station its cross-form design. The original waiting rooms for second and third-class passengers now serve as a buffet and restaurant.

The station was classified in 1995. In 1996, the station was renovated, with the renovation of the interior of the western wing completed in 1998. The station was served by a daily Thalys high-speed rail service to Paris between 1998 and 31 March 2015.

Project Gent-Sint-Pieters
In 2004, the Project Gent-Sint-Pieters was announced as part of a bigger plan to renovate line 50A between Ghent and Bruges.
The reconstructions were planned between 2007 and 2022 and included:
 12 new, wider and longer platforms with more escalators and a lift for better access
 one big open hall below the platforms instead of the 3 current tunnels
 a tram stop with direct access to the platforms
 a new bus station in front of the railway station
 The Virginie Lovelinggebouw, East Flanders' Flemish Administrative Center
 Renovation of the Maria Hendrikaplein, the square in front of the station
 Renovation of the main entrance building
 A new bicycle parking
 Valentin Vaerweyckweg (T4), a new trunk road connecting the station to the ringroad of Ghent (R4) and A10/E40

The work is necessary to make the station more accessible and to increase capacity as the number of passengers grows every year.
This eventually will lead to the removal of several period features that are not part of the classified main building, like the platform canopies, waiting rooms, and the tunnel by P. Grondy.

Timeline
 In 2007, the tower at the entrance of the station has been renovated.
 In 2008, a new glass canopy was placed at the main entrance.
 In 2010, the murals of the main entrance hall have been renovated. The Valentin Vaerweyckweg (T4) and the temporary tramtunnel were opened. And the first part of the new bus station was put into use. Fase 1 of the station itself (Platforms 8-12) started.
 In 2012, the first part of a new underground bicycle parking station was opened, with 1.700 of the intended total of 10.000 parking spots.
 In 2014, the Virginie Lovelinggebouw was finished.
 In 2015, the first new platforms (11 and 12) were put into service.
 In 2017, platforms 10, 9 and 8 were put into use though 8 wasn't finished yet. The project was running late and appeared to be more expensive than anticipated. It was put on hold and new options were investigated to cut costs.
 In January 2020, the new project was announced. The main change was the roof over the platforms. Phase 2 (platforms 7-1) is planned from 2021 until 2026.
Because of the restriction of Ghent's car traffic circulation in 2017, the amount of commuters using a bicycle grew. The plans were adjusted accordingly to build 17,000 bicycle parking spots in total.

Train services
The station is served by the following services:

Intercity services (IC-01) Ostend - Bruges - Ghent - Brussels - Leuven - Liege - Eupen
Intercity services (IC-02) Ostend - Bruges - Ghent - Sint-Niklaas - Antwerpen
Intercity services (IC-03) Knokke/Blankenberge - Bruges - Ghent - Brussels - Leuven - Genk
Intercity services (IC-04) Lille/Poperinge - Kortrijk - Ghent - Sint-Niklaas - Antwerpen
Intercity services (IC-12) Kortrijk - Ghent - Brussels - Leuven - Liege - Welkenraedt (weekdays)
Intercity services (IC-12) Kortrijk - Ghent (weekends)
Intercity services (IC-20) Ghent - Aalst - Brussels - Hasselt - Tongeren (weekdays)
Intercity services (IC-20) Ghent - Aalst - Brussels - Dendermonde - Lokeren (weekends)
Intercity services (IC-23A) Bruges - Ghent - Brussels - Brussels Airport
Intercity services (IC-28) Ghent - Sint-Niklaas - Antwerp (weekdays)
Local services (L-02) Zeebrugge - Bruges - Ghent - Dendermonde - Mechelen (weekdays)
Local services (L-02) Zeebrugge - Bruges - Ghent (weekends)
Local services (L-05) Eeklo - Ghent - Oudenaarde - Ronse
Local services (L-05) Eeklo - Ghent - Oudenaarde - Kortrijk (weekdays)
Local services (L-25) Ghent - Zottegem - Geraardsbergen
Local services (L-28) Ghent - Dendermonde - Mechelen (weekends)

See also
 List of railway stations in Belgium

References

External links

 YouTube video of Ghent Sint Pieter's station

Railway stations in Belgium
Railway stations opened in 1912
World's fair architecture in Belgium
1912 establishments in Belgium
Railway stations in East Flanders
Buildings and structures in Ghent
Tourist attractions in Ghent
Transport in Ghent